Jean-Claude Lavaud (18 May 1938 – 2011) was a French footballer who played for Rennes, Annecy, and France.

References

External links
 Player profile at FFF

1938 births
2011 deaths
French footballers
France international footballers
Stade Rennais F.C. players
Ligue 1 players
French football managers
FC Annecy players
Chamois Niortais F.C. managers
FC Annecy managers
Footballers from Orléans
Association football defenders